"Joy.Discovery.Invention" is a song by Biffy Clyro which opens their 2002 debut album, Blackened Sky. It was their fourth single, appearing as a double A-side with "Toys, Toys, Toys, Choke, Toys, Toys, Toys", a track from their second album, The Vertigo of Bliss. It reached number 86 on the UK Singles Chart and number 46 in the band's native Scotland.

Overview
The title of the song is taken from a line from a Chuck Palahniuk novel called Choke:
It is one of relatively few Biffy Clyro songs where the guitars are in standard tuning, as they usually use Drop D tuning.

Track 3 on the vinyl release is a new version of a song that originally appeared on Iname.

Track listings
Songs and lyrics by Simon Neil. Music by Biffy Clyro.

CD BBQ361CD
 "Joy.Discovery.Invention" – 3:38
 "Toys, Toys, Toys, Choke, Toys, Toys, Toys" – 5:18
 "The Houses of Roofs" – 5:12

7" BBQ361
 "Toys, Toys, Toys, Choke, Toys, Toys, Toys" (Edit) – 4:08
 "Joy.Discovery.Invention" – 3:38
 "All The Way Down: Chapter 2" – 3:49

Personnel
 Simon Neil – guitar, vocals
 Ben Johnston – drums, vocals
 James Johnston – bass, vocals
 Chris Sheldon – producer

Charts

References

External links
"Joy.Discovery.Invention" Guitar Tablature

2002 singles
Biffy Clyro songs
Songs written by Simon Neil
Song recordings produced by Chris Sheldon